Alexander Ivanov may refer to:

Artists
Alexander Ivanov (art collector) (born 1962), Russian art collector, art dealer and businessman
Alexander Ivanov (singer), Belarusian-Russian singer
Alexander Ivanov-Kramskoi (1912–1973), Russian classical guitarist
Alexander Andreyevich Ivanov (1806–1858), Russian painter
Alexander Gavrilovich Ivanov (1898-1984), Russian film director, director of the 1953 film The Star

Athletes
Alexander Ivanov (boxer) (born 1992), Russian boxer who competed at the  2010 Summer Youth Olympics
Alexander Ivanov (chess player) (born 1956), Russian-born American chess player
Aleksandr Ivanov (javelin thrower) (born 1982), Russian javelin thrower
Aleksandr Ivanov (racewalker) (born 1993), Russian racewalker
Alexander Ivanov (speedway rider), Russian motorcycle speedway rider who competed in the 2004 European Speedway Club Champions' Cup
Aleksandr Ivanov (weightlifter) (born 1989), Russian weightlifter
Aleksandr Ivanov (wrestler) (born 1951), Russian amateur Olympic wrestler

Footballers
Aleksandr Ivanov (footballer, born 1928) (1928–1997), Soviet footballer
Oleksandr Ivanov (born 1965), Soviet and Ukrainian football player and coach
Aleksandr Ivanov (footballer, born 1972), Russian footballer
Aleksandr Ivanov (footballer, born 1973), Russian footballer

Others
Alexander Ivanov, Russian official associated with the Wagner Group